Hans-Henning Freiherr von Beust (17 April 1913 – 27 March 1991) was an officer in the Luftwaffe of Nazi Germany during World War II who commanded the 27th Bomber Wing. He was a recipient of the Knight's Cross of the Iron Cross with Oak Leaves. Beust joined the Bundeswehr in 1957 and retired in 1971.

Awards and decorations

 Iron Cross (1939) 2nd Class (16 September 1939) & 1st Class (23 June 1940)
 German Cross in Gold on 10 May 1943 as Major in Kampfgeschwader 27
 Knight's Cross of the Iron Cross with Oak Leaves
 Knight's Cross on 17 September 1941 as Hauptmann and Gruppenkommandeur of the III./Kampfgeschwader 27 "Boelcke"
 336th Oak Leaves on 25 November 1943 as Oberstleutnant and Geschwaderkommodore of Kampfgeschwader 27 "Boelcke"

References

Citations

Bibliography

1913 births
1991 deaths
Barons of Germany
Condor Legion personnel
German Air Force personnel
German military personnel of the Spanish Civil War
German prisoners of war in World War II held by the United States
German World War II pilots
People from the Grand Duchy of Baden
Military personnel from Karlsruhe
Recipients of the Gold German Cross
Recipients of the Knight's Cross of the Iron Cross with Oak Leaves
Nobility from Karlsruhe